Daniela Thomas (born 1959) is a Brazilian film director, screenwriter and editor.

Early life 
In 1959, Thomas was born as Daniela Gontijo Alves Pinto in Brazil.
Thomas' father is Ziraldo Alves Pinto, a cartoonist. Thomas' brother is Antonio Pinto.

Career 
In 1994, Thomas co-directed her first feature film, Terra Estrangeira aka Foreign Land, alongside Walter Salles. Thomas is also its screenwriter and production designer.
In 1998, Thomas debuted as a theatre director with her version of The Seagull by Anton Chekhov, starring Fernanda Montenegro and assisted by Luiz Päetow. In 2007, again with Salles, Thomas directed Linha de Passe, the film which gave Sandra Corveloni a Best Actress Award at the Cannes Film Festival.

Thomas was also one of two creative directors for Rio's contribution to the 2016 Summer Olympics opening ceremony.

Thomas' film Vazante premiered at the 67th Berlin International Film Festival.

Filmography

As a director
1995 - Terra Estrangeira (aka Foreign Land)
1998 - O Primeiro Dia (aka Midnight) 
1998 - Somos Todos Filhos da Terra
2002 - Armas e Paz
2002 - Castanha e caju contra o encouraçado Titanic (short film)
2006 - Paris, je t'aime (segment "Loin du 16ème")
2007 - Linha de Passe
2009 - Sunstroke (Insolação)
2017 - Vazante

As a writer
1995 - Terra Estrangeira
1998 - Menino Maluquinho 2: A Aventura
1998 - O Primeiro Dia
2001 - Abril Despedaçado
2006 - Paris, je t'aime (segment "Loin du 16ème")
2007 - Linha de Passe
2017 - Vazante

Awards 
 2000 Winner of Silver Ariel Award for Midnight (1998).
 2000 Winner of Best Director of Cinema Brazil Grand Prize for Midnight (1998).

See also 
 2000, Seen By...

References

External links
 
 
 Daniela Thomas at Festival-cannes.com

1959 births
Brazilian film directors
Brazilian film producers
Brazilian screenwriters
Brazilian women film producers
Brazilian women film directors
Living people
Place of birth missing (living people)
Brazilian women screenwriters